Mark Dalton may refer to:

Mark Dalton (All My Children), a fictional character on All My Children
Mark Dalton (basketball) (born 1964), Australian basketball player and coach
Mark Dalton (businessman), American businessman